The 1993 amendments to the Constitution of Malaysia  was passed by the Malaysian parliament with the aim of removing legal immunity of the royalty. The changes, which saw the amendments of Articles 32, 38, 42, 63, 72 and 181 in the Constitution of Malaysia, was implemented in March 1993. Before the amendments were made, the Constitution granted rulers who have violated the law not to be prosecuted by the criminal court unless he voluntarily wishes to surrender his legal immunity.

The amendments were made at a time when the Malaysian monarchy witnessed a deteriorating relationship with the Malaysian government. During the late-1980s and the early-1990s, a series of controversial incidents involving the rulers cropped up, many of which came into a conflict of interest with several politicians. After two separate assault incidents by the Sultan of Johor and his younger son which occurred in 1992, the government was prompted to take up the initiative to call for the removal of legal immunity. The rulers were extremely unhappy with the government's calls for the removal of legal immunity, and initially dissented with the government. The government used a two-pronged approach of persuasion and coercion to obtain the assent of the rulers for their rulers.  The rulers gave their assent for the government's proposals to remove the legal immunity, which was later implemented in March 1993.

By some interpretations, these events leading up to the constitutional amendments was considered to be a constitutional crisis, given that the federal government, who needed the endorsement of the Sultans to implement the law, refused and subsequently led to a brief standoff between both sides. However, in most cases, the events leading up to the constitutional amendment was generally closely identified as a monarchy crisis rather than a constitutional crisis.

Background incidents

Gomez Incident

In later part of the year, two separate assault incidents involving members of the Johor royal family allegedly occurred– was aptly dubbed as the "Gomez Incident" by the media. The first one occurred on 10 July 1992, when the second son of the Sultan Iskandar, the Sultan of Johor, Tunku Abdul Majid, flayed a Perak hockey goalkeeper, Mohamed Jaafar shortly after a hockey championship match between Perak and Johor, supposedly having lost his temper when the Perak team won the match by a penalty stroke. The goalkeeper made a police report soon afterward which received attention from Parliament who pressured the Malaysian Hockey Confederation to issue Tunku Majid in October 1992, a ban of five years participation in any national hockey tournaments. The Sultan, enraged by the decision issued to his son, exerted pressure on the state education department to issue orders to school hockey teams in Johor to boycott participation in national tournaments. The decision upset Douglas Gomez, a hockey coach, who criticised the education department for destroying the leadership and called for the resignation of all key office bearers of the Johor Hockey Association.

The criticisms by Gomez made the Sultan angry, so he summoned Gomez to the palace on 30 November where he was reprimanded and beaten by the Sultan, in front of his dumbstruck bodyguards, members of the Johor Military Force (JMF). Gomez, who suffered injuries to his face and stomach, sought treatment at a private clinic the following day and subsequently filed a police report on 6 December, after receiving tacit support from Parliament. The government-backed media, on its part, was swift to report on the incident.

Governmental relations with the Sultan of Kelantan

The party leader of Semangat 46, Tengku Razaleigh Tengku Mohd Hamzah, was a member of the Kelantan royal family and was held by high-esteem by the Sultan of Kelantan, Sultan Ismail Petra. Sultan Ismail Petra allegedly campaigned for Semangat 46 during the 1990 Malaysian general elections, which resulted in Semangat 46 as well as its then-coalition partner, the Pan-Malaysian Islamic Party (PAS) wrestling over control of the Kelantan's state government from the Barisan Nasional government. The Prime Minister of Malaysia, Mahathir Mohamad, expressed his unhappiness over the alleged royal support for Semangat 46, and was accused of violating the rule of political neutrality which was required by a constitutional monarch.
	
In March 1992, customs officials revealed that Sultan Ismail Petra had owed the government RM$2.1 million in import duties after he had purchased a convoy of twenty Lamborghini Diablo cars that were directly flown in from London. The Sultan firmly denied any wrongdoings on his part, and further issued a statement declaring support for the implementation of Islamic laws in the state by the PAS-led state government, which angered the BN-led federal government.

Parliamentary debates and resolutions

The press reports on Gomez plight widespread moral outrage within the Malaysian public.   A special parliamentary session was held on 10 December 1992 which saw all 96 members of the Dewan Rakyat present to pass a unanimous resolution to curb the powers of the rulers if necessary. The subsequent parliamentary session on 27 December saw discussions to remove legal immunity which agitated Sultan Iskandar to hold a rally to oppose the government's actions, but was forced to cancel after intense government pressure. Members of the opposition party had a passive stance towards the government's proposals, particularly from Semangat 46.

A ruler's session was held on 16 January 1993, the following year, which requested the government for additional time for consideration of the government's decision. After extensive negotiation, some rulers chose to refuse to endorse the proposed changes to the Federal Constitution, even after the offer for a special court to prosecute the rulers was proposed, claiming that the implementation of a special court would bring about difficulties in legal technicalities.

The proposed amendments also came with the rule to allow commoners to criticise the Sultans, even the Yang di-Pertuan Agong without fear of the Sedition Act, with the exception of questioning the legitimacy of the monarchy of Malaysia. In addition, the proposed amendments also sought to limit the power of the rulers to pardon offences of family members. Public criticisms of the rulers was also allowed by amendments to the Sedition Act, which makes it no longer an offence to criticise the royalty except to areas pertaining to their legitimate existence.

Nevertheless, parliamentary sessions on subsequent days saw the Dewan Rakyat table the proposed amendments in spite of the Sultans' objections, citing as far to say that there was no need to obtain royal assent to implement laws. Back in 1983, the constitution had been amended so that a veto by the Agong can be over-ridden by a parliamentary vote. Shortly before the Dewan Rakyat concluded its session, 133 out of 180 MPs passed the proposed changes although members of the opposition parties abstained from voting, citing indifferences. The following day, Dewan Negara passed a unanimous resolution to approve of the proposed amendments.

The three rulers, on the other hand, continued to withhold their consent to the amendments which saw the government threatening to withdraw the privileges and continued attacks via the national media on instances of royal excesses of their extravagant lifestyles and even hinting a possibility of ending constitutional monarchy in Malaysia, such as the publication of an article of monarchs who abdicated or were disposed since World War II. A compromise was reached with the Agong when the government offered a compromise which allowed the rulers to delay any legislation within sixty days, provided that the delays were given reasons. The previous proposals offered only a delay of fifteen days for any legislation that were to be raised in parliament.

The Dewan Rakyat passed its implementation on 8 March 1993, while the Dewan Negara approved of its implementation on 30 March. A new chapter, Part XV of the Constitution entitled "Proceedings against the Yang di-Pertuan Agong and the Rulers" was also enshrined.

Media coverage

The government-backed media, on its part, launched a series of reports between 1992 and 1993 detailing alleged misdeeds by members of the royalty not only by the Johor royal family but also on other royal houses from other states, questioning their extravagant lifestyles and misuse of moral authority to gain alleged concessions. The Pahang royal family, in particular, was criticised for the way which they allegedly gained favourable timber forestry concession rates and the unusually high shares which they were accorded in the timber forestry industry.

The views of the Islamic Religious leaders were also well publicised, who criticised the royal excesses and even went as far as placing members of the royalty as equal members with the commoners in the eyes of Allah.

In Kelantan, Sultan Ismail Petra was also heavily criticised for failing to pay import duty taxes after he purchased a convoy of imported Italian luxury sports car as well as alleged biased support for Semangat 46 by Dr Mahathir, for violating the constitution which states that monarchs will have to take on a neutral role in political affairs. The leader of Semangat 46,  Tengku Razaleigh Tengku Mohd Hamzah was a member of the Kelantan royal family.

Aftermath

Another further constitutional amendment in May 1994 allowed any law that has been passed by both the Dewan Rakyat and Dewan Negara to become law within 30 days, irrespective of whether the Agong had given his assent. The new legislation further reduced the veto power of the Agong — amended previously in 1983, which also sparked a constitutional crisis. The older bill stated that Rulers could withhold assent of a proposed amendment within 30 days once both houses of parliament pass a proposed amendment.

The new constitutional amendment took some interesting twists following its amendments: In 1996, a Singaporean filed to sue the Sultan Ahmad Shah of Pahang for defamation in the special court for the rulers, which was turned down by the Special Court, establishing the precedent that the right to sue a ruler only belongs to a Malaysian citizen.

In 1998, then Tengku Idris (later Sultan Sharafuddin) of Selangor sued a company, Dikim Holdings in the High Court. In 1999, when his father, Sultan Salahuddin was elected as the Yang di-Pertuan Agong (Paramount Ruler) of Malaysia, Tengku Idris was appointed as Regent of Selangor. The case was referred to the Federal Court on whether the Regent is considered a ruler, which the court replied in the negative. In 2001, Sultan Salahuddin died and Tengku Idris ascended the Selangor throne. The case was referred to the Federal Court again, which the court ruled that the High Court had lost jurisdiction over the case, and the case must be withdrawn and refiled in the Special Court. In both cases, only the Special Court had authority to exercise jurisdiction over the rulers, whether they were to be tried or intended to try another party.

The Yang di-Pertuan Besar of Negeri Sembilan, Tuanku Ja'afar became the first ruler to have judgement made against him in the Special Court, whereby he was ordered to settle US$1 million in debts he had owed to a bank. The landmark verdict prompted his oldest son, the Regent of Negeri Sembilan, Tunku Naquiyuddin to advocate the restoration of rulers' immunity  during a speech in November 2008. This raised concerns among the public, in view of the history of past royal excesses, but specifically the Gomez incident. Tunku Naquiyuddin, however, added further that immunity to rulers should not be extended to cases when rulers commit acts of criminality, such as assault.

Notes

References

 Asia-Pacific Defence Reporter, by Peter Isaacson, 1992
 Dictionary of the Modern Politics of South-East Asia, Michael Leifer, Taylor and Francis, 2001, 
 Europa World Year Book 2: Kazakhstan-Zimbabwe, Taylor and Francis Group, 2004, 
 Government and Society in Malaysia, Harold A. Crouch, Cornell University Press, 1996, 
 Handbook of Federal Countries, 2002: A Project of the Forum of Federations, Ann L. Griffiths, Karl Nerenberg, Forum of Federations, McGill-Queen's University Press — MQUP, 2003 
 Kerajaan mansuh kekebalan raja Melayu: semua parti politik sokong, Mokhtar Petah, ART Media, 1993, 
 Law, Capitalism and Power in Asia: The Rule of Law and Legal Institutions, Kanishka Jayasuriya, Routledge, 1999, 
 Legal Aspects of Doing Business in Asia and the Pacific, Christian Campbell, 2006, 
 Islam Embedded: The Historical Development of the Pan-Malaysian Islamic Party PAS, 1951–2003, Ahmad-Noor A. Noor, Farish Ahmad Noor, Malaysian Sociological Research Institute, 2004, 
 Islam in Malaysian Foreign Policy, Shanti Nair, Institute of Southeast Asian Studies, Routledge, 1997, 
 Mahathir, the Secret of the Malaysian Success, by Hajrudin Somun, Lejla Somun-Krupalija, published by Pelanduk Publications, 2003, 
 Malaysian Politics Under Mahathir, Robert Stephen Milne, Diane K. Mauzy, Routledge, 1999, 
 Monarchy in South-East Asia: The Faces of Tradition in Transition, Roger Kershaw, Routledge, 2001, 
 Nature and Nation: Forests and Development in Peninsular Malaysia, Jeyamalar Kathirithamby-Wells, Nordic Institute of Asian Studies, NUS Press, 2005, 
 Personalized Politics: The Malaysian State Under Mahathir, In-wŏn Hwang, Institute of Southeast Asian Studies, 2003, 
 The End of Empire and the Making of Malaya, T. N. Harper, Cambridge University Press, 2001, 
 Transitions in Malaysian society and politics: towards centralizing power, in (The Asia-Pacific: A Region in Transition, Jim Rolfe, Honolulu, Hawaii: Asia Pacific Center for Security Studies, 2004), pp. 300–322 [Chapter 18], by Michael Leigh and Belinda Lip

External links
 A BILL intituled: An Act to amend the Federal Constitution., Dewan Rakyat, January 1993
  Pindaan-Pindaan YANG DICADANGKAN KEPADA RANG UNDANG-UNDANG PERLEMBAGAAN (PINDAAN) 1993, Dewan Rakyat, January 1993

Amendments to the Constitution
Amendments to the Constitution of Malaysia
Malaysian federal legislation